Dominic Minghella (born 1966) is a British television producer and screenwriter. His most successful project has been the creation of the ITV network comedy-drama series Doc Martin, starring Martin Clunes, which began in 2004. The main character's surname, Ellingham, is an anagram of the Minghella family name. Minghella was also the chief writer and show runner of BBC One's 2006 production Robin Hood, produced independently for the BBC by Tiger Aspect Productions.

Family
Dominic Minghella is the brother of Loretta Minghella and the late Anthony Minghella, Max Minghella being his nephew and Hannah Minghella his niece; both of whom work in film. Dominic's son, Dante, appeared on the 2006 Channel 4 programme Child Genius.  He read PPE at Merton College, Oxford. His sister Edana Minghella co-wrote four episodes of Doc Martin.

Career
As a child, Minghella starred in the first film his brother Anthony directed, A Little Like Drowning.

He wrote the film The Prince and the Pauper in 2000. Minghella was lead writer and executive producer of the BBC One series Robin Hood for the first two seasons, overseeing 26 episodes and several of the place names used in the series were directly taken from place names on his native Isle of Wight.  He has also written for Hamish Macbeth, starring Robert Carlyle, and for Boon.

Minghella was producer of the 2012 adaptation of Daphne du Maurier's novel, The Scapegoat, directed by Charles Sturridge and starring Matthew Rhys. He was also show runner for the first series of the American historical drama Knightfall.

In December 2018, as British Prime Minister Theresa May struggled to convince Parliament to support her Brexit agreement with the European Union, Minghella wrote and directed a three-minute political short 'The People's Vote', starring Andy Serkis in a parody of May as the two faces of his Gollum-Sméagol character, alternately coveting her 'precious' exit document and (less strongly) considering her duty to the British people, as support for a further referendum on the divisive issue. The short's credits also include Minghella's children Louise, who is an assistant producer and Dan, who is a script editor.

Covid-19
In 2020, Minghella was hospitalised with COVID-19 and was unsure whether he would survive. After a few days he was well enough to be released.

References

External links

 Official website: minghella.com

1966 births
21st-century British screenwriters
21st-century English male writers
Alumni of Merton College, Oxford
British television writers
British male television writers
Date of birth missing (living people)
Doc Martin
English people of Italian descent
English television writers
English screenwriters
English male screenwriters
Living people
Place of birth missing (living people)
Showrunners